Alexander Draper Wolff (born November 1, 1997) is an American actor and musician. He first gained recognition for starring alongside his older brother Nat in the Nickelodeon musical comedy series The Naked Brothers Band (2007–09), which was created by the boys' mother Polly Draper. Wolff and his brother released two soundtrack albums for the series, The Naked Brothers Band and I Don't Want to Go to School, which were co-produced by their father Michael Wolff. Subsequent to the conclusion of the Nickelodeon series, Wolff and his older brother formed a duo called Nat & Alex Wolff, and released the albums Black Sheep (2011) and Public Places (2016). The brothers also co-starred in their mother's comedy-drama film Stella's Last Weekend (2018).

Wolff focused his career on film roles, portraying Dzhokhar Tsarnaev in Patriots Day (2016) and John "Derf" Backderf in My Friend Dahmer (2017). His other acting roles include My Big Fat Greek Wedding 2 (2016), Jumanji: Welcome to the Jungle (2017), and Hereditary (2018). Wolff made his directorial debut with the drama film The Cat and the Moon (2019).

Personal life
Wolff was born in Manhattan, New York City, to actress and writer Polly Draper and jazz pianist Michael Wolff. He is the younger brother of actor and musician Nat Wolff. His father is Jewish and his mother is Christian. Wolff is a maternal grandson of venture capitalist and civic leader William Henry Draper III, a nephew of venture capitalist Tim Draper, a cousin of actress Jesse Draper, and a great-grandson of banker and diplomat William Henry Draper Jr.

Career
Wolff began his acting career at the age of 6 in the 2005 musical comedy film The Naked Brothers Band: The Movie, written and directed by his mother. It was commissioned by Nickelodeon as the pilot to the television series The Naked Brothers Band (2007–2009) which was also created, produced, written and directed by his mother. He contributed lyrics, vocals, and instrumentation for both the film and series; their father produced and supervised the music. The show released two soundtrack albums and the song "Crazy Car" ranked #83 on the Billboard Hot 100 charts.

In 2007, he portrayed the young boy in the Fall Out Boy music video "The Take Over, The Breaks Over". Wolff made a cameo in the Nickelodeon TV movie Mr. Troop Mom and the USA police-procedural, comedic television drama Monk, both in 2009. He also starred in his playwriting What Would Woody Do? at The Flea Theater—which was directed by his mother—and the HBO medical drama In Treatment, both in 2010. Wolff later appeared in the comedy film The Sitter (2011) and starred alongside Brendan Fraser in the independent film HairBrained (2012).

In 2015, he starred in the indie drama Coming Through the Rye. In 2016, he had a supporting role in the comedy sequel My Big Fat Greek Wedding 2 and played terrorist Dzhokhar Tsarnaev in the drama Patriots Day, about the Boston Marathon bombing.

In 2018, Wolff starred in the supernatural horror film Hereditary. He made his directorial debut with 2019's The Cat and the Moon, which he also wrote and starred in.

In 2020, Wolff participated in Acting for a Cause, a live classic play and screenplay reading series, created, directed and produced by Brando Crawford. Wolff played Algernon in The Importance of Being Earnest by Oscar Wilde and Warren Straub in This Is Our Youth by Kenneth Lonergan. The reading raised funds for non-profit charities including Mount Sinai Medical Center. Wolff co-produced the second reading.

Awards
For Wolff's work on The Naked Brothers Band series and film, he obtained a Broadcast Music, Inc. Cable Award in 2007, Audience Award for a Family Feature Film at the Hamptons International Film Festival in 2005, and was nominated for a Young Artist Award both in 2008 and 2009. He also received a Certificate of Outstanding Achievement for Best Actor at the Brooklyn International Film Festival for his lead role in the film HairBrained in 2013. On October 11, 2018, Wolff received the Auteur Award at the San Diego International Film Festival.

He received a Canadian Screen Award nomination for Best Actor at the 9th Canadian Screen Awards in 2021, for his performance in the film Castle in the Ground.

Filmography

Film

Television

References

External links

1997 births
21st-century American male actors
Living people
American people of Jewish descent
American male child actors
American male drummers
American drummers
American male guitarists
American male film actors
American male television actors
The Naked Brothers Band members
American male singer-songwriters
Guitarists from New York City
21st-century American singers
21st-century American guitarists
21st-century American drummers
21st-century American male singers
Draper family
Singer-songwriters from New York (state)